The Barrister Ranjit Mohanty Group of Institution (BRM) group of Institution was established in 2000 as BRM trust for providing education in computer science for school students for Government of Odisha. Subsequently it diversified by adding engineering, management and vocational courses to its curriculum. All the courses except diploma engineering courses are affiliated with Biju Patnaik University of Technology. The diploma engineering courses are affiliated to SCTE & VT of Odisha.

History
The BRM group of Institution was established in 2000 as BRM trust for giving computer education through the  E-School Project of Government of Odsha. Then in 2001 it started its first in class education with diploma education. Then in 2002 it added BBA & BCA under Utkal University. Again in 2003 it started a 2-year full-time MBA programme under affiliation of BPUT & which was approved by AICTE. Subsequently it added MCA, B. Tech & M. Tech to its curriculum.

Academic profile
BRM Group is a group of colleges in Odisha. More than 2000 students got enrolled to the college in every years curriculum. It is subsidized with BRM International Institute of Technology, BRM International Institute of Management & BRM B-Schools. Its curriculum is maintained as per the university norms of BPUT & AICTE. The educational group has collaborated with many international organisations for increasing its values and name.

Campus and facilities
The institution is spread over 8 acres of land, situated on the banks of Kuakhai river. It can reached through NH-16 (formerly NH-5). The closest railway station is Bhubaneswar railway station and the closest airport is Biju Patnaik Airport.

Courses offered
 Master of Technology (M. Tech)
 Master of Business Administration (MBA)
 Master of Computer Application (MCA)
 Bachelor of Technology (B. Tech)
 Diploma in Engineering

References

External links
 

Education in Odisha
2000 establishments in Orissa
Educational institutions established in 2000